Umegatani Tōtarō may refer to:

Umegatani Tōtarō I, a sumo wrestler, the 15th Yokozuna
Umegatani Tōtarō II, a sumo wrestler, the 20th Yokozuna